The village of Rosslare Harbour, also known as Ballygeary, grew up to serve the needs of the harbour of the same name (now called Rosslare Europort), first developed in 1906 by the Great Western Railway and the Great Southern and Western Railway to accommodate steamferry traffic between Great Britain and Ireland.  This port also serves France and Spain, traffic is mainly roll-on roll-off (RoRo). Rosslare Harbour railway station opened on 30 August 1906.

Village
Although the harbour itself is located close to, and for census purposes is co-terminous with, the village of Ballygeary, and within the townland of Ballygillane Big, it was named after the village of Rosslare, some 4 km away (8 km by road) along the coast. The village of Ballygeary was divided into two townlands, one known as 'tin town' and the other as 'straw town'. It is believed this was because of the roofs on the houses.

The village has a number of guesthouses, hotels, a Roman Catholic church, a post office and some shops. Just south of the harbour is a small strand leading to Greenore Point, where grey seals can sometimes be seen.

The harbour is home to an RNLI lifeboat station.

Railways and ferries
Services provided by Irish Rail on the Dublin-Rosslare railway line from Rosslare Europort railway station to major places such as Wexford, Enniscorthy, Arklow, Wicklow, Greystones, Bray to Dublin Connolly.

From Dublin Connolly onward rail connections via the Sligo Line links with Longford and Sligo and the Belfast Line links with Drogheda, Dundalk, Newry, Portadown,  and Belfast Central.

Bus transport
Rosslare Harbour and Rosslare Europort are served by Bus Éireann routes 40, 132, 370, 379 and 385 and Local Link route 387. The main routes serving Rosslare Harbour are Bus Éireann Expressway route 40 which provides several services a day to/from Waterford via New Ross and the 387 to Wexford several times daily. Local route 370 replaces the rail service to Waterford and runs twice a day each way (except Sundays) serving locations in South County Wexford previously served by the railway; Bridgetown, Wellingtonbridge and Campile. Expressway route 2 used to link the Harbour with Dublin Airport every hour but was withdrawn in September 2012. There is now only one through bus a week to Dublin – route 132 departing Rosslare Europort on Thursday mornings. It runs cross-country via Carnew.

See also
List of towns and villages in Ireland
List of RNLI stations

References

External links

1906 establishments in Ireland
Populated places established in 1906
Towns and villages in County Wexford
Port cities and towns in the Republic of Ireland